In 2020, the Chinese Communist Party (CCP) and various Chinese regulatory bodies, under CCP General Secretary Xi Jinping, began a regulatory spree, strengthening regulations, issuing fines, and introducing or modifying laws. Though mostly targeted at disrupting the growth of "monopolistic" technology companies, the government also introduced other reforms with implications for large swathes of the economy and life in China. Actions taken included the implementation of restrictions on for-profit tutoring and education companies, the refinement of existing rules for limits on minors playing online video games, and the introduction of new antitrust rules.

Background and origins

Historical background
China's government is nominally communist, but reforms under Chinese leader Deng Xiaoping in the 1980s relaxed government control of some portions of the economy, allowing for the emergence of private industry. China maintains state-controlled companies, such as China Mobile, and the economy, referred to as a "socialist market economy", operates with a high degree of state control when compared to the economies of many western nations.

Recent events and context
Relations between China and the United States became strained during the Trump administration and tensions remain high during the Biden administration over disputes such as the sovereignty of Taiwan. An ongoing trade war between the two countries has negatively impacted both economies. This has led to speculation that the two countries will consciously "decouple" their economies.

China has a rapidly aging population. The nation also has a declining birth rate, attributed to the costs associated with raising children.

Reasoning, timing, and goals

As stated by Chinese officials
Chinese leadership has said the reforms aim to increase "common prosperity" in the hopes of shrinking the country's income and wealth disparities. Some of the efforts aim to lower the costs associated with child-rearing in the hopes of reversing a falling birth-rate.

Interpretations and speculation
The Wall Street Journal has stated that the goal of the reforms is to establish tighter control over the market economy, granting the state and the Communist Party renewed legitimacy. Other commentators have speculated that the reforms amount to an attempt by Xi to retrench his power before the 20th National Congress of the Chinese Communist Party and an effort aimed at China increasing its self-reliance, due to heightened tensions with trading partners.

Beginning of reform activity

"Three red lines" and property sector regulation
A working paper published by the National Bureau of Economic Research in 2020 estimated that China's property sector accounted for 29% of the country's economic activity. In August 2020, in an effort to better manage the sector, which historically has been heavily leveraged, Chinese regulators introduced drafts of rules dubbed the "three red lines" to formally limit the borrowing of real estate firms. The "three red lines" mandate that developers maintain:

a debt-to-asset ratio of 70%,
a 100% cap on net debt to equity,
and enough cash on hand to satisfy short-term borrowing, debts, and liabilities.

Reuters reported that developers responded to the drafts by intensifying the use of tactics used to disguise debt. By the end of 2020, approximately half of the country's 66 largest developers were in compliance with the new regulations. In April 2021, only two firms—Evergrande and R&F Properties—remained non-compliant with all three red lines.

Suspension of Ant Group IPO

Ant Group, a Chinese technology-enabled financial company majority-owned by its founder, Jack Ma, and affiliated with Ma's other major holding, Alibaba, began taking steps toward an initial public offering in 2020. Ant Group operates a number of lines of business, including Alipay, an online payments platform, Zhima Credit, a credit scoring program, and Yu'e Bao, a money market fund. Ant Group intended to raise $34 billion through the IPO process. This would have been the largest such offering by any company to date, above the $29.4 billion raised by Saudi Aramco as a result of its 2019 offering.

Due to Ant Group's scale—the company has approximately one billion users in China—and its operations, which include lending services, the company has attracted regulatory scrutiny in the past. The China Securities Regulatory Commission previously imposed new restrictions on money-market funds, a move attributed to the size and growth of Yu'e Bao, an Ant offering. Though the company asserts it does not function as a bank or a financial institution, Chinese banks have voiced their belief that Ant draws deposits away from them, in effect, undermining the banking system. The People's Bank of China requested data from banks that lent through Ant in mid-2020 and the State Administration for Market Regulation informally began an investigation earlier in the year into whether Alipay and WeChat Pay, a Tencent subsidiary, had abused their size to hamper competitors.

Several days before the IPO was to take place, the company's founder and controlling shareholder, Ma, made negative statements about Chinese regulators and the governing political party, the Chinese Communist Party. Ma criticized regulators for their focus on risk mitigation. Soon after the comments were made, Ma and other senior Ant executives were summoned to a meeting with the China Securities Regulatory Commission, the China Banking and Insurance Regulatory Commission, and the State Administration of Foreign Exchange as well as representatives from the country's central bank, the People’s Bank of China. Ant Group issued a statement disclosing that the Ant and government representatives discussed "Views regarding the health and stability of the financial sector".

After the meeting, and two days before the IPO was set to occur, the offering was suspended by the Shanghai Stock Exchange. The Shanghai Stock Exchange referenced "major issues" as the reasoning behind the suspension. The exchange further indicated that the company no longer conformed with listing requirements. Ant subsequently suspended the Hong Kong listing. The Wall Street Journal attributed the suspension to the personal will of Xi, who had become infuriated by Ma's comments, citing "Chinese officials with knowledge of the matter", though these assertions have also been characterized as "rumors". The suspension was unexpected, surprising bankers working on the transaction, the broader financial industry, and consumers prepared to invest in the offering. It has been referred to as "abrupt" and "shocking". Ant began working to address regulator concerns in January 2021, though as of September 2021, no public plans for an IPO by the company had been announced.

Jack Ma retreated from the public eye after the IPO's suspension. Some speculated that Ma had left China altogether. He did not appear in public between October 2020 and January 2021. In January 2021, he spoke in a live-streamed video. In the video, he discussed his commitment to philanthropy and improving quality of life for those in rural China.

"Disorderly Capital" and anti-monopoly stance
Soon after the suspension of Ant's IPO, in November 2020, Chinese regulators introduced drafts of new anti-monopoly guidelines directed at large technology firms. China had, in January 2020, revised its Anti Monopoly Law to include language applicable to internet and technology companies. In December, Alibaba and a subsidiary of Tencent were both fined for not seeking approval of deals the companies had completed, which was framed as an anti-monopoly action. The anti-monopoly rules introduced in November were formalized as guidelines for companies in February 2021 by the State Administration for Market Regulation. These newly instituted rules include banning online retailers from presenting different prices to different consumers based on data collected about them.

A month after the release of the draft anti-monopoly rules, party officials began using the phrase the "disorderly expansion of capital" to describe the target of economic policy and reforms. "Disorderly" has also been translated as "irrational". This "expansion" has been construed as responsible for the monopolistic tendencies of technology companies, expensive tutoring for children, and other issues in China.

Acceleration of reform

Comments by Xi and SAMR expansion

Xi Jinping called for further regulation of tech companies and "platform" companies in March 2021. Major platform companies in China include Alibaba and Tencent. Xi further called for existing financial regulations to apply to all financial transactions. The nation's anti-trust authority, the State Administration for Market Regulation, began hiring new staff the month after Xi made these comments. Reuters reported the regulatory body aimed to add between 20 and 30 staff, adding to their then-current headcount of 40. Reuters also reported that SAMR would have a larger budget and would be granted other resources.

In April 2021, the same month Reuters reported on SAMR's growth, Alibaba was fined $2.8 billion. The fine was issued in response to Alibaba's practice of compelling third-party merchants using its site to choose between listing their offerings on Alibaba and the company's rivals, rather than on both. Financial and legal commentators interpreted this fine as the end of action against Alibaba.

Ban of cryptocurrencies
China's Vice Premier Liu He announced that China would take steps against the mining and trading of bitcoin in May 2021 without providing other information. The announcement caused the price of the digital asset to decline. China had previously become popular with bitcoin miners due to cheap electricity prices but the hikes in the usage of coal power associated with mining clash with China's climate-related goals. The popularity of mining in China may have led to increases in the illegal extraction of coal. Though many miners have shuttered or moved their operations, Chinese authorities have continued to search for illegal operators continuing to work disguised as other businesses.

In September 2021, the People’s Bank of China banned all cryptocurrency transactions and related transactions. This announcement caused the price of bitcoin to fall approximately 8%. The central bank also banned foreign companies from providing cryptocurrency services to Chinese citizens. Regulations from earlier in the year had banned domestic companies from providing services like cryptocurrency trading.

Restriction of for-profit tutoring
On July 24, 2021, rules were introduced to change the operation of tutoring companies focused on teaching school-age children. The new rules prohibit these companies from turning a profit, prohibit them from raising foreign capital, and prohibit tutoring related to the school syllabus on holidays and weekends. Other regulations include the banning of the tutoring of children under six years old. Commentators referred to the new regulations as, effectively, a "death penalty" for the industry. American investment firms impacted by the new rules include Sequoia, Tiger Global Management, and Warburg Pincus. Other foreign firms impacted include Singapore's Temasek Holdings.

The ban resulted in the emergence of "underground" tutoring services, advertised using other descriptions by those offering them. The Ministry of Education announced it would seek to eliminate these services by pursuing companies and individuals offering them in September 2021.

Regulatory scrutiny of Didi
Didi, a Chinese vehicle-for-hire company headquartered in Beijing, went public in June 2021. The company listed in the United States, becoming the largest Chinese trading debut since Alibaba's IPO in 2014. On July 4, 2021, the Cyberspace Administration of China ordered app stores to remove Didi, after citing violations on the company's collection and usage of personal information. Didi had disclosed to potential investors that increased regulatory scrutiny was possible. In July, Chinese regulators fined Didi for failing to disclose acquisitions. Didi allegedly considered going private in late July. The company denied these claims.

Regulators asked Didi to create a plan to delist from American exchanges in November 2021. The company initially intended to either return to its previous status as a private company or to relist in Hong Kong.

Other reforms and actions

Three child policy

China modified its longstanding one child policy in 2016 and allowed couples to have two children. The policy was updated again in 2021, allowing couples to have three children. This modification to policy was announced on 31 May 2021, at a meeting of the Politburo of the Chinese Communist Party. The policy went into effect in August 2021. Two months later, the policy was abolished and all family planning restrictions were lifted.

Labor laws 
On August 27, 2021, the Supreme People’s Court with the Ministry of Human Resources and Social Security issued a public notice that China's 996 work schedule utilized by big technology companies was illegal. While no new laws were implemented, it signaled that the government would step up enforcement of existing laws, under which the 996 work schedule should not exist and overtime beyond 44 hours per week should be paid out.

Fines
The State Administration for Market Regulation fined Meituan $534 million in October 2021 in response to its practice of demanding that retailers using their app sign exclusivity agreements. The fine was lower than expected, leading to an increase in Meituan's share price.

Contemporaneous events

Evergrande liquidity crisis

Despite the "three red lines", Chinese real estate developer and conglomerate Evergrande released a statement on 31 August 2021, warning it would default on its debts if it failed to raise enough cash to cover them. At the time, Evergrande was China's most indebted real estate developer. On 24 September 2021, Evergrande missed off-shore bond payments totaling US$83.5 million. While the company had 30 days to avoid defaulting on the debt, analysts felt the company would likely fail to pay its creditors.

Future plans
The State Council of the People's Republic of China and the Central Committee of the Chinese Communist Party together released a five-year plan outlining plans for regulations and updated laws in August 2021. The plan calls for the continued introduction of rules and reform governing portions of the economy including the technology sector, finance, and defense.

Impact
The reforms have instilled "paranoia and paralysis" at Chinese technology companies. The reforms also decreased the number of jobs available at technology companies, increasing the unemployment rate among young people.

References

Xi Jinping
2020 in China
2021 in China
History of the People's Republic of China
Chinese economic policy
2020s economic history
Legal history of China
Regulation in China
Competition law